The 1996–97 season was Perth Glory's first season in the National Soccer League and first overall season in the top flight of Australian soccer.

Background

After a number of years of speculation around a team from Perth, Perth businessmen, Nick Tana and Paul Afkos put in a bid to join the 1996–97 A-League (as the NSL was known after being relaunched for the 1995–96 season) in late 1995. Arena Investments, a company owned by Tana and Afkos, had stepped in to invest in the Perth Kangaroos IFC after the initial investors of the 1994 FAS Premier League champions pulled out. On 1 December 1995, the name Perth Glory was announced and is considered to be the club's foundation date.

Review

Pre-season
To allow the club to prepare for their first season, the Glory were excused from participation in the 1996–97 National Cup in September and October 1996. Instead the Glory played a number of friendly matches, starting with a match against Italian team Sampdoria which they lost 3–0. This was the only match that the club lost in the leadup to the season, with a series of matches against Western Australian opposition all ending in wins to the Glory.

October
The league season began with a match against UTS Olympic at Perth Oval. The ground was ordinarily an Australian rules football ground so temporary seating was brought in to make a smaller arena for soccer. A crowd of 9639 saw the Glory lose 4–1 to Olympic, with Alan MacKenzie scoring a late consolation goal.

April
The Glory entered the final round of the season needing just one point to secure a finals position. However they were defeated 3–1 by the Melbourne Knights after being reduced to ten players, in front of a crowd of 10,000 at knights stadium.

Players

Transfers

Transfers in

Transfers out

Match results

Legend

Preseason matches

League results

Statistics

Leading goalscorers
 14 – Bobby Despotovski
 12 – Vas Kalogeracos

Player details
List of squad players, including number of appearances by competition

Statistics accurate to end of 1996–97 NSL season

References

Perth Glory FC seasons